Arthur Victor "Vic" Evans (1918 – date of death unknown) was a Welsh professional football who played as a defender. He made 84 appearances in the English Football League for Wrexham in the 1930s.

References

1918 births
Sportspeople from Mold, Flintshire
Date of death unknown
English footballers
Association football defenders
English Football League players
Wrexham A.F.C. players